This is a list of comic books, by country.

Argentina (historieta)

Alack Sinner by Carlos Sampayo (author) and José Antonio Muñoz (artist)
Bárbara by Ricardo Barreiro (author) and Juan Zanotto (artist)
El Eternauta by Héctor Germán Oesterheld (author) and Solano López (artist)
Ernie Pike by Héctor Germán Oesterheld (author) and Hugo Pratt (artist)
Lúpin by Guillermo Guerrero and Héctor Mario Sidoli
Mafalda by Quino
Nippur de Lagash by Robin Wood (author) and various artists.
Mort Cinder by Héctor Germán Oesterheld (author) and Alberto Breccia (artist)
Patoruzu by Dante Quinterno
El Cazador de Aventuras by Jorge Lucas
El Caballero Rojo by Tony Torres and Mariano Navarro
Animal Urbano by Edu Molina
La historia de la señora de la dominación by Andressa DePrims
Mikilo by Rafael Curci

Australia

 Brainmaster
 Captain Atom
 Cyberswine
 Cyclone!
 Dark Nebula
 Dee Vee (1997)
 The Example (2005)
 Fire Fang (1982)
 Greener Pastures
 Ginger Meggs Annual
 Hairbutt the Hippo (1989)
 Ink Spots
 The Kookaburra
 The Mask
 Niteside and the Rock
 The Panther
 Phantastique
 Pizza Man
 Platinum Grit (1993)
 The Raven
 Reverie
 The Scorpion
 Vampire!
 Vixen (1977)
 Zero Assassin
 Homeless Loose (2013)
2015(2015) BY A.Chan

Austria

ASH - Austrian Superheroes by Harald Havas

Belgium (stripverhaal, strip; bande dessinée, BD)

Agent 212 by Raoul Cauvin (author) and Daniël Kox (artist)
Alpha by Youri Jigounov (artist) & P. Renard (author), later by Mythic (author)
Apocalypse Mania by Philippe Aymond (artist) and Laurent-Frédéric Bollée (author)
Bakelandt by Hector Leemans.
Barelli by Bob de Moor.
Benoit Brisefer by Peyo.
Bernard Prince by Greg (author) and Hermann (artist)
Bert by Kamagurka.
Bessy by Willy Vandersteen.
Biebel by Marc Legendre.
Blagues Coquines by Dany, and others.
Blake and Mortimer by Edgar Pierre Jacobs
Bob Morane by Dino Attanasio, William Vance, Pierre Joubert, Henri Lievens, Claude Pascal, René Follet. Based on the novels by Henri Vernes.
Bobo by Paul Deliège
Boule et Bill by Jean Roba
Bruno Brazil by William Vance and Louis Albert (Greg)
Buck Danny by Jean-Michel Charlier and Victor Hubinon
Chlorophylle, by Raymond Macherot, Dupa,...
Les Cités Obscures by Benoit Peeters (author) and François Schuiten (artist)
Colonel Clifton, by Raymond Macherot, later by Jo-El Azara, then by Turk & De Groot, then by Bédu, and currently by Rodrigue
Comanche by Greg (author) and Hermann (artist)
Cori, de Scheepsjongen by Bob de Moor.
Cowboy Henk by Kamagurka (author) and Herr Seele (artist).
Cubitus by Dupa.
Cupidon by Raoul Cauvin (text) and Malik (drawings).
Dallas Barr by Haldeman (author) and Marvano (artist)
Djinn by Jean Dufaux (author) & Ana Mirallès (artist)
Double Masque by Jean Dufaux (author) & Jamar (artist)
L'Eleve Ducobu by Zidrou (author) and Godi (artist).
Les Eternels by Yann (author) & Felix Meynet (artist)
Gaston Lagaffe by André Franquin
De Geuzen by Willy Vandersteen
Giacomo C. by Jean Dufaux (author) & Griffo (artist)
Gil Jourdan by Maurice Tillieux (author and artist) & Gos (artist)
India Dreams by Maryse Charles (author) & Jean-François Charles (artist)
Les Innommables by Yann (author) and Didier Conrad. 
Insiders by Bartoll & Garreta.
Inspector Canardo by Benoit Sokal.
I.R.$. by Bernard Vrancken (artist) & Stephen Desberg (author)
Isabelle by Will, André Franquin, Raymond Macherot (author) and Yvan Delporte (artist).
Jeremiah by Hermann (artist)/
Jerry Spring by Jijé.
The Adventures of Jo, Zette and Jocko by Hergé
Johan and Peewit by Peyo
Jommeke by Jef Nys
Jugurtha by Jean-Luc Vernal (author) and Hermann (artist)
Kabouter Wesley by Jonas Geirnaert.
Kid Paddle by Midam.
De Kiekeboes by Merho.
Kramikske by Jean-Pol.
Largo Winch by Philippe Francq (artist) & Jean van Hamme (author)
Léonard by Turk & De Groot
Luc Orient by Greg (author) and Eddy Paape (artist).
Lucky Luke by Morris
De Lustige Kapoentjes by Marc Sleen.
Les Maîtres de l'Orge by Francis Vallès (artist) & Jean van Hamme (author)
Marsupilami by André Franquin
Mélusine by Clarke (artist) & Gilson (author)
Modeste et Pompon by André Franquin
Murena by Jean Dufaux (author) & Philippe Delaby (artist)
Natacha by François Walthéry
Nero by Marc Sleen
Niklos Koda by Jean Dufaux (author) & Olivier Grenson (artist).
La Patrouille des Castors by Jean-Michel Charlier (author) and MiTacq (artist).
Le Petit Spirou by Tome & Janry.
Pierre Tombal by Raoul Cauvin (author) and Marc Hardy (artist)
Piet Fluwijn en Bolleke by Marc Sleen.
Piet Pienter en Bert Bibber by Pom.
Poussy by Peyo.
Quick & Flupke (Quick et Flupke) by Hergé
Le Rayon U (The U Ray) by Edgar Pierre Jacobs
Redbeard by Victor Hubinon
La Ribambelle by Jean Roba. 
De Rode Ridder (Red Knight) by Willy Vandersteen.
 Sam by Marc Legendre (author) and Jan Bosschaert (artist).
Sammy by Berck and Jean-Pol.
Le Scorpion by Enrico Marini (artist) & Stephen Desberg (author)
Le Scrameustache by Gos (artist) & Walt (author)
Sibylline by Raymond Macherot
The Smurfs (Les Schtroumpfs) by Peyo
Soda by Philippe Tome (author), Luc Warnant (artist) and Bruno Gazzotti (artist).
Suske en Wiske (also called Spike and Suzy, Bob & Bobette or Willy and Wanda) by Willy Vandersteen
Spirou et Fantasio by (in chronological order) Rob-Vel, Jijé, André Franquin, Jean-Claude Fournier, Raoul Cauvin (author) and Nic Broca (artist), Yves Chaland, Tome and Janry, and Morvan (author) and Munuera (artist) (currently)
Thorgal by Jean van Hamme (author) and Grzegorz Rosinski (artist)
The Adventures of Tintin by Hergé
Les Tours de Bois-Maury by Hermann
Les Tuniques Bleues by Raoul Cauvin (author)  and Lambil (artist)
Urbanus by Urbanus (author) and Willy Linthout (artist).
La vengeance du comte Skarbek by Grzegorz Rosinski (artist) & Yves Sente (author)
Le Vieux Nick et Barbe-Noire by Marcel Remacle
XIII by Jean van Hamme (author) and William Vance (artist)
Yoko Tsuno by Roger Leloup
Zig et Puce by Greg, creation by Alain Saint-Ogan
Zilverpijl by Frank Sels, Edgard Gastmans, Karel Verschuere.

Bolivia
Super Cholita

Brazil (gibi, história em quadrinhos)

10 Pãezinhos by Fábio Moon & Gabriel Bá
Capitão Brasil
Jimmy Five (Cebolinha) by Maurício de Sousa
Chiclete com Banana by Arnaldo Angeli Filho
Piratas do Tietê by Laerte Coutinho
Geraldão by Glauco Villas Boas
Níquel Náusea by Fernando Gonsales
Transubstanciação by Lourenço Mutarelli
Monica's Gang (Turma da Mônica) by Maurício de Sousa

Canada

Arbalet by André Pijet
Captain Canuck
Cerebus the Aardvark by Dave Sim with Gerhard
Dirty Plotte
Drawn & Quarterly
Les Cantons – Rondel et Baton à la conquête du Saladier d'argent  by André Pijet
Le Tour du Québec en BD
Lethargic Lad
Louis Riel
New Triumph
Night Life
Northguard
Peepshow - Joe Matt.
Palookaville
Scott Pilgrim by Bryan Lee O'Malley
Thieves & Kings by Mark Oakley
To Be Announced
The True North
The True North II
Endurance by Newryst
Underwater
Weapons of Terra Ocean by Kenneth Lu
Yummy Fur

Colombia
Mojicón by Adolfo Samper
Copetin by Ernesto Franco
Tukano by Jorge Peña
Calarcá by Carlos Garzón
Dina by Bernardo Rincón (comics)|
Zambo Dendé

Chile
Condorito by René Rios (Pepo)

China (manhua)

Côte d'Ivoire
Magie Noire by Gilbert G. Groud

Croatia
Mister Mačak

Denmark
Egoland. Comic series.
Illustrated History of Denmark. Illustration.
Jernpotte (Ironpot). Graphic novel.
Og det var Danmark.
Rasmus Klump. Comic series.
Skæve Vinkler (Slanted Lines), comic series.
Ulvevinter (Wolfwinter), graphic novel.

Egypt
Samir
Middle East Heroes
 Tok Tok

Finland (sarjakuvat)
Aku Ankka, the Finnish translation of Donald Duck
Kramppeja ja Nyrjähdyksiä
Lätsä, the Finnish translation of Andy Capp.
Masi, the Finnish translation of Beetle Bailey.
Moomin by Tove Jansson and Lars Jansson
Mämmilä by Tarmo Koivisto
Praedor by Petri Hiltunen
Punaniska by Harri "Wallu" Vaalio
Velho, the Finnish translation of The Wizard of Id.
Viivi & Wagner by Jussi "Juba" Tuomola

France (bande dessinée, BD, bédés)

120 Rue de la Gare and Brouillard au pont de Tolbiac by Léo Malet (author) and Jacques Tardi (artist)
Adèle Blanc-Sec by Jacques Tardi
Agatha Christie by François Rivière (author) and Jean-François Miniac (artist)
Agence Barbare by Marko and Olier
Anibal Cinq by Alejandro Jodorowsky, Manuel Moro and Georges Bess
Asterix and Obelix by René Goscinny (author) and Albert Uderzo (artist and author)
Blueberry by Jean-Michel Charlier (author) and Jean Giraud (artist)
Blue Space by Richard Marazano and Chris Lamquet
Castaka written by Alejandro Jodorowsky, artwork by Das Pastoras
La Caste des Méta-Barons written by Alejandro Jodorowsky, artwork by Juan Gimenez
César and Jessica
Le Cycle de Cyann written by François Bourgeon
Dungeon written by Lewis Trondheim and Joann Sfar, drawn by Lewis Trondheim, Joann Sfar, Christopher Blain, Manu Larcenet, Phillipe Bercovici, Andréas, Blanquet, Boulet
Fanfoué des Pnottas by Félix Meynet
Frantico by Frantico
L'Incal by Alejandro Jodorowsky and Jean Giraud
Iznogoud by René Goscinny (author) and Jean Tabary (artist and author)
Juan Solo by Alejandro Jodorowsky and Georges Bess
Lone Sloane by Philippe Druillet
The spiffy adventures of McConey (original title: Lapinot) by Lewis Trondheim
Michel Vaillant by Jean Graton, later by Philippe Graton
Monsieur Jean by Charles Dupuy and Philippe Berberian
Oumpah-pah by René Goscinny (author) and Albert Uderzo (artist)
Pyrénée by Régis Loisel (author) and Philippe Sternis (artist)
Rahan by Roger Lécureux (author) and André Chéret (artist)
Roach Killer by B. Legrand (author) and Jacques Tardi (artist)
Titeuf by Zep
Valérian and Laureline by Pierre Christin (author) and Jean-Claude Mézières (artist)
 Zig et Puce by Alain Saint-Ogan, later revived by Greg

Germany (Comic)

Captain Berlin created by Jörg Buttgereit
Fix und Foxi created by Rolf Kauka
Das kleine Arschloch by Walter Moers
Mosaik created by Hannes Hegen
Nick Knatterton created by Manfred Schmidt
Sigurd by Hansrudi Wäscher
Various gay comics by Ralf König
Werner by Brösel

Greece
 O Κόκκορας / The Rooster - 1981, created by Arkas
 Show Business - 1983, created by Arkas
 Ξυπνάς Μέσα Μου Το Ζώο / You Bring Out the Animal in Me - 1985, created by Arkas
 Μετά την καταστροφή / After the Destruction - 1986, created by Arkas
 Φάε το κερασάκι / Eat the Cherry - 1987, created by Arkas
 Ο Παντελής Και Το Λιοντάρι / Pantelis and the Lion - 1987, created by Arkas
 Αταίριαστοι Έρωτες / Ιncongruous Love - 1988, created by Arkas
 Ο Ισοβίτης / The Lifer - 1988, created by Arkas
 Χαμηλές Πτήσεις / Flying Starts - 1991, created by Arkas
 Καστράτο / Castrato - 1995, created by Arkas
 Πειραματόζωα / Animal Testing - 1998, created by Arkas
 Ο καλός λύκος / The Big Good Wolf - 1998, created by Arkas
 Η Ζωή Μετά / The Hereafter - 1999, created by Arkas
 Οι Συνομήλικοι / Peers, created by Arkas
 Θηρία Ενήμερα, created by Arkas
 Το Μικρό και το Μεγάλο / The Small and the Big, created by Arkas
 Επικίνδυνα Νερά / Dangerous Waters, created by Arkas
 Blood Opera - 2004, created by Ilias Kyriazis
 Blockbuster, created by Ilias Kyriazis
 Turta - 2006, created by Ilias Kyriazis and Tassos Papaioannou
 Manifesto - 2005, created by Ilias Kyriazis
 Manifesto 2 - 2009, created by Ilias Kyriazis
 Μια καρδιά για τον Λεοντόκαρδο / Falling for Lionheart - 2011, created by Ilias Kyriazis
 Galaxia, created by Manos Lagouvardos
 Logicomix - 2008, created by Apostolos Doxiadis, Christos Papadimitriou, Alecos Papadatos and Annie Di Donna
 Giant-size Fascists, created by Con Chrisoulis
 Κρακ Κόμικς / Krak Komiks, created by Tasos Maragkos (Tasmar)
 Apocalypse Mode On - 2010, created by Giorgos Kampadaes
 Ύψιλον / Ypsilon - 2004, created by Vasilis Chilas and Thanos Kollias

India

Indonesia
Archi & Meidy, by Yohanes Surya and Wendy Vega
Si Juki, by Faza Meonk
Archipelago, by Chancil (Candra Dwiyanto)
KOSMIK Mook, by Sunny GHO

Israel
Zbeng! by Uri Fink
Rutu Modan#Exit Wounds by Rutu Modan

Italy (fumetto)

Japan (manga)

Korea (manhwa)

Kuwait
Teshkeel Comics
The 99

Lebanon
Anxiety

Malaysia
Kecemprengman

• BoBoiBoy Galaxy 

• BoBoiBoy Galaxy Season 2

Mexico (historieta or monitos)

Los Agachados by Rius
El Cerdotado by Leopoldo Jasso
La familia Burrón by Gabriel Vargas
Kalimán
El Pantera
Hombres y Héroes
Karmatron by Oscar Gonzalez Loyo
Los Supermachos by Rius
Ultrapato by Edgar Delgado

Nigeria

Supa Strikas by Chevron
Monsters:Rise of the X5 by Joseph Livingstone and Marvel comics

The Netherlands (stripverhaal)

Agent 327 by Martin Lodewijk.
De Avonturen van Pa Pinkelman by Godfried Bomans (author) and Carol Voges (artist).
Bello by Marten Toonder.
Birre Beer by Phiny Dick (author) and Ton Beek (artist). 
Boes by Wil Raymakers and Thijs Wilms. 
Bulletje en Boonestaak by Georges van Raemdonck.
Claire by the Wirojas  (Robert van der Kroft, Wilbert Plijnaar and Jan Van Die).
Dick Bos by Alfred Mazure. 
Dirk-Jan by Mark Retera.
Douwe Dabbert by Thom Roep (author) and Piet Wijn (artist).
Eric de Noorman by Hans G. Kresse
De Familie Doorzon by Gerrit de Jager.
De Familie Fortuin by Peter de Wit.
F.C Knudde by Toon van Driel.
Flippie Flink by Clinge Doorenbos (author) and Robert Raemaekers (artist).
Fokke & Sukke by Bastiaan Geleijnse, John Reid (author) and Jean-Marc Tol (artist).
Fokkie Flink by Henk de Wolf (author), Joop Geesink and Henk Zwart (artist).
Franka by Henk Kuijpers.
De Generaal by Peter de Smet.
Gilles de Geus by Hanco Kolk & Peter de Wit.
Haagse Harry by Marnix Rueb.
Heinz by Eddie De Jong en René Windig.
Holle Pinkel by Andries Brandt and Piet Wijn.
Jan, Jans en de Kinderen by Jan Kruis.
Joop Klepzeiker by Eric Schreurs.
Kapitein Rob by Pieter Kuhn.
Kappie by Marten Toonder.
Kick Wilstra by Henk Sprenger. 
Koning Hollewijn by Marten Toonder.
Panda by Phiny Dick, Harry van den Eerenbeemt (author) and Marten Toonder (artist).
Paulus the woodgnome by Jean Dulieu.
Roel Dijkstra by Jan Steeman and Andrew Brandt.
Sigmund by Peter De Wit.
S1NGLE by Hanco Kolk & Peter de Wit.
Sjef van Oekel by Wim T. Schippers (author) and Theo van den Boogaard (artist).
Sjors & Sjimmie by Frans Piët.
Storm by Don Lawrence (artist).
Tekko Taks by Henk Kabos and James Ringrose.
Tom Puss (Tom Poes) by Marten Toonder.
Vader & Zoon by Peter van Straaten.
Van Nul tot Nu by Thom Roep (author) and Co Loerakker (artist).

Norway (tegneserier)
M by Mads Eriksen
Nemi by Lise Myhre
Pondus by Frode Øverli
Lunch by Børge Lund

Pakistan

Team Muhafiz by AzCorp Comics
Zindan: The Last Ansaars by Omar Mirza and Khurram Methabin

Philippines (komiks)

Poland (komiks)

Awantury i wybryki małej małpki Fiki-Miki by Kornel Makuszyński (author) and Marian Walentynowicz (artist)
Biblia by Jerzy Wróblewski
Binio Bill by Jerzy Wróblewski
Biocosmosis by Edvin Volinski (author) and Nikodem Cabała (artist)
Dziesięciu z wielkiej ziemi by Jerzy Wróblewski
Funky Koval by Maciej Parowski, Jacek Rodek (authors), and Boguslaw Polch (artist)
Gail by Piotr Kowalski
Janosik by Tadeusz Kwiatkowski and prof. Jerzy Skarzynski (artist)
Kajtek i Koko and Kajko i Kokosz by Janusz Christa
Kapitan Kloss by Andrzej Zbych and Mieczyslaw Wisniewski
Kapitan Żbik created by Władysław Krupka
Na co dybie w wielorybie czubek nosa Eskimosa by Tadeusz Baranowski
Pilot smiglowca by Witold Jarkowski (author) and Grzegorz Rosinski (artist)
Przygody Kleksa by Szarlota Pawel
Przygody Koziołka Matołka by Kornel Makuszyński (author) and Marian Walentynowicz (artist)
Straine by Krzysztof Tkaczyk and Bartosz Minkiewicz
Tajemnica złotej maczety by Jerzy Wróblewski
Tytus, Romek i A'tomek by Henryk Chmielewski
Walenty Pompka na wojnie by Ryszard Kiersnowski (author) and Marian Walentynowicz (artist)
Wick i Wacek by Wacław Drozdowski

Puerto Rico
 Juan Bobo by Puerto Rican school children 
 United States of Banana by Puerto Rican author Giannina Braschi and Swedish cartoonist Joakim Lingengren
 La Borinquena by Puerto Rican artist Edgardo Miranda-Rodriguez.

Russia (комиксы) 

 Major Grom by Artyom Gabrelyanov and Evgeny Fedotov
 Demonslayer[ru] by Alex Hatchett and Evgeniy Fedotov
 Exlibrium by Natalia Devova
 Red Fury by Artyom Gabrelyanov and Sergei Volkov
 Friar by Artyom Gabrelyanov and Alexei Gravitskii
 Meteora by Artyom Gabrelyanov and Igor Khudaev
 Survilo by Olga Lavrentyeva
 ILya Muromets. Pesn' Solovya by Roman Sheverdin
 Hacker by Aleksandr Eremin
 Sobakistan by Vitaliy Terletsky
 Kot by Oleg Tishchenkov
Les by Askold Akishin
Mobi Bi by Daniil Vetluzhskih
Diptih by Alexey Troshin

Serbia

 Cat Claw
 Kobra
 Tarzan (Serbian Version)
 Billy the Spit
 Technotise
 Generation Tesla
 Faktor 4
 Prijatelji (comics)

Spain (historieta, cómic or tebeo)

South Africa

Cottonstar by Ben G Geldenhuys and Danelle Malan
Gofu (comic) by Deon de Lange
Juvies (comic) by Jarred Cramer
Madam & Eve
The Lil' Five by They Did This!
Oneironaut & Other Tales by Daniel Hugo
Rebirth (graphic novel) by Josh Ryba and Daniel Browde
Week Daze by Andrew Cramer
Wrath (comic) by Christopher Beukes

Sweden (tecknade serier)
Arne Anka by Charlie Christensen
Bamse by Rune Andréasson
Örn Blammo by Johan Wanloo
Bobo by Lars Mortimer
Felix by Jan Lööf
Ratte by Magnus Knutsson and Ulf Jansson
Rocky by Martin Kellerman
Ensamma mamman by Cecilia Torudd
Socker-Conny by Joakim Pirinen 
Kapten Stofil by Joakim Lindengren

Switzerland (bande dessinée, BD, bédés)
Yakari by Job (author) & Derib (artist)

United Arab Emirates
Majid

United Kingdom

DC Thomson

Other children's anthology comics
Buster
Cor!!
The Eagle
Lion
Scream!
Tiger
Valiant
Victor
Whizzer and Chips

Other
2000 AD
 Book of Pages
The Adventures of Luther Arkwright and The Tale of One Bad Rat by Bryan Talbot
From Hell by Alan Moore (author) and Eddie Campbell (artist)
Night Warrior
Marshal Law by Pat Mills and Kevin O'Neill
Sam119
Trigan Empire by Don Lawrence
V for Vendetta by Alan Moore (author) and David Lloyd (artist)
Viz comic
Warrior

United States

See also
 List of newspaper comic strips
 List of comics by country
 List of comic creators
 List of feminist comic books
 Lists of books

External links

Best Selling Comic Books List according to no. of copies sold worldwide.
Collectorism - A list of the greatest comics of all time A brief history with the biggest names in comics

 
Comic books
Comic Books